Eyob is a personal name of Ethiopian and Eritrean origin. It is the Geʽez (an ancient Ethiopic language) translation of Job from the Bible.  Notable people with the name include:

Eyob Faniel (born 1992), an Eritrean-born Italian long-distance runner.
Eyob Mekonnen (1975–2013), Ethiopian reggae singer.
Eyob Zambataro (born 1998), an Italian football player of Ethiopian origin.

Amharic-language names
Tigrinya-language names